Anti-Western sentiment, also known as anti-Atlanticism or Westernophobia, refers to broad opposition, bias, or hostility towards the people, culture, or policies of the Western world.

Definition and usage

In many modern cases, anti-Western sentiment is fueled by anti-imperialism, particularly against countries that are "deemed guilty for colonial crimes of the past and present," such as Germany, the United Kingdom, France, Spain and Portugal. Anti-Western sentiment occurs in many countries, including the West– especially European countries. Broad anti-Western sentiment also exists in the Muslim world against Europeans and Americans. Anti-American sentiment stems from US support for Israel, the 2003 invasion of Iraq, and numerous sanctions against Iran.

Samuel P. Huntington argues that, after the Cold War, international conflict over economic ideology would be replaced with conflict over cultural differences. His "Clash of Civilizations" argues that economic and political regionalism will increasingly shift non-Western countries towards geopolitical engagement with countries that share their values.  He argues that Muslim population growth simultaneous to a growth in Islamic fanaticism is leading to a rejection of Westernization.

Africa

Democratic Republic of the Congo
Congolese independence leader Patrice Lumumba blamed the Western world for imperialism. On 1 August 1960, he "gave a speech that indicated in no ambiguous terms that the United Nations, its Secretary-General, the United States, and the Western powers were all corrupt entities." During the Congo Crisis, Lumumba received support from the Soviet Union, which contributed to his overthrow and execution by the Western-backed Mobutu Sese Seko.

When Mobutu became leader of the Congo, he renamed the country Zaire and created the national policy of Authenticité or Zaireanization, which aimed to remove all Western cultural influence from the country.

In 2001, anti-Western sentiment skyrocketed in the Congo following the assassination of Congolese president Laurent Kabila, with many Congolese citizens blaming the Western world for his death.

Ethiopia
Anti-Western sentiment broadly expressed in Ethiopia during the Tigray War as result of resentment over pressure in internal politics and request over resolution of the conflict. On 30 May 2021, a pro-government rally took place in Addis Ababa to protest an international pressure denouncing "Western intervention" and US economic and security assistance sanctions. Protestors also waved banners supporting the controversial Grand Ethiopian Renaissance Dam project. On 22 October 2022, tens of thousands protestors took a demonstration in Addis Ababa's Meskel Square, whereas the other cities in Ethiopia, including Bahir Dar, Gondar, Adama, Dire Dawa and Hawassa also hosted similar demonstration to denounce the intervention.

Ghana
Kwame Nkrumah, the first president of Ghana, had a staunch anti-Western stance and blamed the United States for many of Africa's difficulties.

Nigeria
Located in northeastern Nigeria, the name of the extremist islamic terrorist group Boko Haram translates to "Western education is forbidden" or "Western civilization is forbidden."

Zimbabwe
Former Zimbabwean president Robert Mugabe used anti-Western rhetoric in his speeches, and he implemented policies that seized farmland from white European farmers.

Asia

Mainland China

Anti-Western sentiment in mainland China has been increasing since the early 1990s, particularly among Chinese young adults. Notable incidents which have resulted in a significant anti-Western backlash have included the 1999 NATO bombing of the Chinese embassy in Belgrade, the 2008 demonstrations during the Olympic torch relay, and alleged Western media bias, especially in relation to the 2008 Tibetan unrest. While available public opinion polls show that the Chinese people view the United States in a positive light, there remains suspicion over the West's motives toward China stemming largely from historical experiences, specifically the "century of humiliation."

These suspicions have been increased by the Chinese Communist Party's "Patriotic Education Campaign". Although Chinese millennials are largely apathetic to politics, China's Gen Z now has an unprecedentedly low opinion of the West and "Western values" since the Chinese economic reforms of the 70s. Young Chinese have grievances such as the Western alienation of Chinese tech companies, anti-East Asian racism, anti-Chinese propaganda, and pressure on China's internal affairs, among other issues. In a study conducted by Toronto University in April 2020, 4 out of every 5 Chinese under 30 years old said they do not trust Americans.

Japan

There is a history of criticism of the so-called West within the intellectual history of Japan.

India

Although opinion polls suggest positive views towards Western countries today, anti-Western sentiments were common in early 20th century India due to the Indian independence movement.

Singapore
Lee Kuan Yew, the former Prime Minister of Singapore, argued that East Asian countries such as China, East Timor, Japan, Korea, the Philippines, Singapore, Thailand or Vietnam should be based on "Asian values." In other words, countries such as the Four Asian Tigers should aspire to have Western-style standards of living without accepting liberal democratic social institutions and principles. The Asian values are primarily influenced by the ideals of Confucianism, notably filial piety, and social cohesion. The concept of Asian values is widely criticized as a means for instituting authoritarianism, notably by Amartya Sen.

Middle East

Islamism

Together with political Salafis, jihadists (also called Salafist jihadists) view Christian Europe as a land inhabited by infidels (Dar al-Kufr). For jihadists, this makes Christian Europe a just target for armed jihad, e.g., acts of war or terrorist attacks. Jihadists refer to such lands as Dar al-Harb (lands of war). Jihadists themselves motivate their attacks in two prominent ways: to resist Western/Christian military intervention in Muslim countries and to discourage perceived insults against Islam such as the Muhammad Cartoons.

John Calvert writes that in their critique of the West, Islamists quote Western thinkers like Alexis Carrel, Oswald Spengler, Arnold J. Toynbee, and Arthur Koestler.

Extremists terrorist groups al-Qaeda and ISIL/ISIS are said to be both anti-Western. They have been known to promote terrorism in Western countries, including Russia.

Europe

Russia

Anti-Western sentiment in Russia dates back to the 19th century intellectual debate between Westernizers and Slavophiles. While the former deemed Russia to be a lagging Western country, the latter rejected these claims outright and viewed Western Christendom as 'rotten'. An important anti-Western figure during the reign of Alexander III of Russia was Konstantin Pobedonostsev, a former liberal who eventually renounced and thoroughly criticized his former views.

Under the Soviet Union, 'the West' eventually became synonymous with 'the capitalist world', resulting in the appearance of the famous propagandist cliché 'corrupting influence of the West'.

After the Cold War, a number of politicians in the Russian Federation have supported an explicit promotion of Russian Orthodox traditionalism and a rejection of Western liberalism. Some ultra-nationalist politicians, such as the late Vladimir Zhirinovsky, express the most anti-Western sentiment.

Vladimir Putin has promoted explicitly conservative policies in social, cultural and political matters, both at home and abroad. Putin has attacked globalism and neoliberalism and promoted new think tanks that stress Russian nationalism, the restoration of Russia's historical greatness, and systematic opposition to liberal ideas and policies. Putin has collaborated closely with the Russian Orthodox Church in this cultural campaign. Patriarch Kirill of Moscow, head of the Church, endorsed his election in 2012, stating Putin's terms were like "a miracle of God." The Russian Orthodox Church is known to host groups that promote nationalist and anti-Western tendencies.

The Russian government has restricted foreign funding of some liberal NGOs. Pro-Russian activists in the former Soviet Union frequently equate the West with homosexuality and the gay agenda. The 2013 Russian gay propaganda law was welcomed by nationalist and religious political figures in Russia as a bulwark against Western influence.

The Yarovaya Law prohibits evangelism by religious minorities. It was used to ban the United States-based Jehovah's Witnesses.

Samuel P. Huntington in Clash of Civilizations controversially classifies Russia and the rest of Orthodox Europe as a different civilization from Western civilization.

Turkey

During the Ottoman period of Turkish history, a tradition of anti-Westernism developed.

Latin America
Anti-Western sentiment exists in Latin America, especially in countries where the population consists mostly of Native Americans, such as Bolivia, Guatemala or Peru. On the other hand, in countries like Argentina, Brazil, Chile, and Uruguay, Europeans are more represented in the population. Consequently, there are many Latin Americans who identify as Westerners, so the anti-Western discourse is therefore not as prominent as in other regions. That is not to say, however, that there is no anti-Western discourse. Indeed, it can be found in countries with nationalist and populist leaders or movements, including left-wing political parties in Colombia, Mexico, Nicaragua or Venezuela. In recent years, Latin American nations have increasingly turned away from the United States.

Anti-Western sentiments are related to the history of American and European political interventions in Latin America. Many people in the region lay sharp criticism on the United States for supporting Cold War era coups and right-wing anti-communist dictatorships. Most Latin American countries tend to be more regional, focusing on internal cooperation. Accompanying this is a notable distrust of globalization. Latin American organizations like Mercosur, Prosur and Unasur are strong groups that represent this aspect of Latin American foreign policy.

Samuel P. Huntington in Clash of Civilizations controversially classifies Latin America as a different civilization from Western civilization.

See also
 Anti-Americanism
 Anti-Australian sentiment
 Anti-Canadian sentiment
 Anti-Europeanism
 Anti-Armenian sentiment
 Anti-Austrian sentiment
 Anti-British sentiment
 Anti-Croatian sentiment
 Anti-Dutch sentiment
 Anti-Estonian sentiment
 Anti-French sentiment
 Anti-Georgian sentiment
 Anti-German sentiment
 Anti-Greek sentiment
 Anti-Hungarian sentiment
 Anti-Irish sentiment
 Anti-Italian sentiment
 Anti-Polish sentiment
 Anti-Portuguese sentiment
 Anti-Romanian sentiment
 Anti-Russian sentiment
 Anti-Serbian sentiment
 Anti-Slavic sentiment
 Anti-Spanish sentiment
 Anti-Ukrainian sentiment
 Anti-Japanese sentiment
 Anti-South Korean sentiment
 Anti-imperialism
 Clash of Civilizations
 Globalization
 Eurasianism
 Neocolonialism
 Pan-Africanism
 Pan-Arabism
 Pan-Asianism
 Pan-nationalism
 Left-wing populism
 Right-wing populism
 Active measures
 Wolf warrior diplomacy

References

 
Anti-European sentiment
Anti-Americanism